Los Tres Reyes is a music group initially linked to the trío romántico style, comparable to Los Panchos, before expanding to perform varied Latin American music. Gilberto and Raúl Puente, twins, were founders of the group in 1957 and remain in it. Gilberto plays the requinto very well and is able to imitate the Los Panchos style easily. Gilberto is considered one of the best requinto players of Mexico. The group continued into the 1970s, but took a fifteen-year hiatus before re-forming in 1991. During the hiatus Gilberto Puente was an accompanist to Mariachi Vargas de Tecalitlán. Since the re-forming the group has recorded for the Smithsonian Institution. Although originally based in Mexico it is largely linked to San Antonio today and is noted for a duet version of No Me Queda Más with Tejano musician Selena.  Another recent success was "Recordando Los Panchos"; Here they sing a series of boleros made famous by Los Panchos; then the final line says: "interpretan los Tres Reyes a Los Panchos". Los Tres Reyes retired in January 2019.

References 

Mexican musical groups